Basque pelota was contested at the Pan American Games in 1995, 2003, 2011 and 2019.

Medal table

References

 
Sports at the Pan American Games
Pan American Games